Central Lee Community School District is a rural public school district headquartered in Donnellson, Iowa. Entirely in Lee County, it serves Argyle, Donnellson, Franklin, Montrose and adjacent rural areas. A small section of Fort Madison lies in the district limits.

Schools 
Central Lee Elementary School
Central Lee Middle School
Central Lee High School

History

A bond election was scheduled for April 2018 for $13.3 million but the vote was unsuccessful. A bond election, this time for $12.9 million and without the proposed agriculture and weight room renovations, was scheduled for September 10, 2019.

See also
List of school districts in Iowa

References

External links
 Central Lee Community School District
 
Education in Lee County, Iowa
School districts in Iowa